Walter Robert Bogdan Tkaczuk (born September 29, 1947) is a Canadian former ice hockey centre who played fourteen seasons in the National Hockey League for the New York Rangers between 1967 and 1981. Tkaczuk's family, originally from Ukraine, moved to Timmins, Ontario from West Germany when he was two years old. He was the first player born in Germany to appear in an NHL game.

NHL career
Tkaczuk centred the "Bulldog Line" with Bill Fairbairn and Dave Balon, who was later replaced by Steve Vickers. He could score his fair share of goals, however he was much better at producing assists. Tkaczuk's finest contribution to the game was that of the defensive forward, being among the NHL's elite shadows and faceoff men. This complemented the Rangers' high-scoring GAG line of Jean Ratelle, Rod Gilbert, Vic Hadfield. During his first 2 seasons with the Rangers, the club and media pronounced his name, "Taychuk" because Rangers' Director of Player Personnel felt it was easier to say than the correct pronunciation, "Ka-Chook."  Prior to the 1969-70 season, the club announced he would henceforth be called by the correct pronunciation.

In the 1972 playoffs, with Ratelle sidelined with a broken ankle and Gilbert hampered by injuries, Tkaczuk played a key role as the Rangers defeated the defending champions Montreal Canadiens, and the previous season's finalists Chicago Black Hawks, to reach the Stanley Cup Finals. While the Rangers lost to the Boston Bruins in six games, Tkaczuk earned much respect for holding the Bruins' Phil Esposito without a goal in the series.

Walt Tkaczuk was asked to play for Team Canada in the 1972 Summit Series but declined the invitation due to his obligation to his summer hockey school. He was replaced by Philadelphia Flyers' centre Bobby Clarke.

In the 1979 playoffs, Tkaczuk was a key contributor as the Rangers upset the first place New York Islanders to reach the Stanley Cup Finals, where they fell to Montreal in five games.

Towards the end of a game on February 2, 1981, Tkaczuk suffered an eye injury when hit by a puck.  He never played again. 
Over his career, Tkaczuk played in 945 NHL games, scoring 227 goals and 451 assists for 678 points. Despite his physical presence, he only accumulated 556 minutes in penalties.

In the 2009 book 100 Ranger Greats, the authors ranked Tkaczuk at No. 14 all-time of the 901 New York Rangers who had played during the team's first 82 seasons.

Post-hockey career
Tkaczuk is co-owner of River Valley Golf Course and Tube Slide in St. Marys, Ontario.

Career statistics

Regular season and playoffs

References

External links
 

1947 births
Living people
Buffalo Bisons (AHL) players
Canadian ice hockey centres
Canadian people of Ukrainian descent
West German emigrants to Canada
Ice hockey people from Ontario
Kitchener Rangers players
New York Rangers players
Omaha Knights (CHL) players
People from Emsdetten
Sportspeople from Münster (region)
Sportspeople from Timmins
Canadian expatriate ice hockey players in the United States